British Cavalier was a  tanker that was built in 1942 for the Ministry of War Transport (MoWT) as Empire Cavalier. In 1945, she was sold to the British Tanker Co Ltd and renamed British Cavalier, serving until 1959 when she was scrapped.

Description
The ship was built by Sir J Laing & Sons Ltd, Sunderland. She was launched on 27 August 1942 and completed in November.

She had a GRT of 9,891 and a NRT of 5,912.

She was propelled by a 4-stroke Single Cycle Single Action diesel engine which had eight cylinders  diameter by  stroke. The engine was built by Hawthorn, Leslie & Co Ltd, Newcastle upon Tyne.

History
Empire Castle was built for the MoWT. She was placed under the management of Mungo Campbell & Co Ltd. She was allocated the United Kingdom Official Number 169033. The Code Letters BFCF were allocated and her port of registry was Sunderland.

Empire Cavalier was a member of a number of convoys during the Second World War.

ON 166
Convoy ON 166 departed Liverpool on 11 February 1943 and arrived at New York on 3 March. Empire Cavalier joined the convoy at sea, having departed from Halifax, Nova Scotia.

HX 229
Convoy HX 229 departed New York on 8 March 1943 and arrived at Liverpool on 23 March. Empire Cavalier was carrying a cargo of aviation fuel.

HX 313
Convoy HX 313 departed New York on 10 October 1944 and arrived at Liverpool on 24 October. Empire Cavalier was bound for Thameshaven.

In 1945, Empire Cavalier was sold to the British Tanker Co Ltd and renamed British Cavalier. She served until 1957, and was laid up on 13 November at Swansea. On 23 May 1959, she arrived at Briton Ferry for scrapping.

References

External links
Old Ship Picture Galleries: Empire Cavalier 01

1942 ships
Ships built on the River Wear
Tankers of the United Kingdom
Ministry of War Transport ships
Empire ships
World War II tankers
Merchant ships of the United Kingdom